Frech is a surname. Notable people with the surname include:

 Ezra Frech (born 2005), American Paralympic athlete
 Fritz Frech (1861–1917), German geologist and paleontologist
 Jessica Frech, American pop/folk singer-songwriter
 Magdalena Fręch (born 1997), Polish tennis player

See also
 
 Buwch Frech, a cow in Welsh folklore